The Satellite is a lesser known monophonic analog synthesizer that was manufactured by Moog Music from 1973 to 1979 in response to the ARP Pro Soloist. It had one VCO. It was designed for use with any organ or sound system. The American company Thomas Organ bought the license to build it. The case is made out of wood.

Preset sounds
 Brass
 Reeds
 Strings
 Bell
 Lunar

Notable users
 Vangelis

 Ronnie Foster

Further reading
https://www.moogmusic.com/legacy/moog-product-timeline

See also
 List of Moog synthesizer players
 Moog Music
 Moog synthesizer
 Robert Moog

References

External links

Moog synthesizers
Monophonic synthesizers
Analog synthesizers